John MacKay MacLennan (1885–1977) was a Scottish minister, who served as Moderator of the General Assembly of the Free Church of Scotland in 1938.

Life

He graduated with an MA from Edinburgh University in 1915.

From 1915 to 1923 he was minister of the Free Church in Glenurquhart then was minister of Lairg from 1923 to 1965.

He died in Inverness on 25 August 1977, aged 92, and is buried in the churchyard at Kirkton of Lochalsh.

References

1885 births
1977 deaths
Alumni of the University of Edinburgh
20th-century Ministers of the Free Church of Scotland